Xylorycta chionoptera is a moth in the family Xyloryctidae. It was described by Oswald Bertram Lower in 1893. It is found in Australia, where it has been recorded from Victoria.

The wingspan is about 36 mm. The forewings are shining snow white with the costal edge blackish from the base to one-fourth, the rest of the costa orange. The hindwings are light fuscous grey.

References

Xylorycta
Moths described in 1893